Autophagy related 9B is a protein that in humans is encoded by the ATG9B gene.

Function

This gene functions in the regulation of autophagy, a lysosomal degradation pathway. This gene also functions as an antisense transcript in the post-transcriptional regulation of the endothelial nitric oxide synthase 3 gene, which has 3' overlap with this gene on the opposite strand. Mutations in this gene and disruption of the autophagy process have been associated with multiple cancers. Alternative splicing results in multiple transcript variants.

References

Further reading